Council elections for the Preston City Council were held on 2 May 2019 as part of the 2019 United Kingdom local elections. The Council has undergone a wholesale boundary revision, reducing the number of both Councillors and electoral wards, resulting in the first 'all out' election since 2002 Preston Council election.

All locally registered electors (British, Irish, Commonwealth and European Union citizens) who are aged 18 or over on polling day are entitled to vote in the local elections.

The boundary changes for 2019 reduced the number of Councillors from 57 to 48.

Results summary
The new electoral wards each elect three members.

The results of the 2019 elections are summarised below.

Election Result

Ward results

Ashton

Brookfield

Cadley

City Centre

Deepdale

Fishwick and Frenchwood

Garrison

Greyfriars

Ingol and Cottam

Lea and Larches

Plungington

Preston Rural East

Preston Rural North

Ribbleton

Sharoe Green

St. Matthew's

References 

2019
2019 English local elections
2010s in Lancashire
May 2019 events in the United Kingdom